Tanya Moore and Tina Rodriguez were two transgender friends & sex workers on Philadelphia's thirteenth street in 1986. The pair disappeared on June 30, 1986 after getting into the car of a couple of clients. On July 3, 1986 their mutilated and dismembered bodies were found burning at a baseball diamond in Middletown.

Disappearance and deaths
After getting into a light medium-sized van with two male clients on June 30, 1986, the men they had left with were never seen again. Other transgender sex workers describe the men last seen with the victims as being two white men between the ages of twenty-five and thirty-five. The driver had curly dark hair and a mustache; the second suspect was blonde and clean shaven. At 12:31 a.m. on July 3, 1986, police and firefighters responded to the report of a brush fire; the Fairless Hills Fire Co. found two burning bodies instead. Through meticulous fingerprint analysis, hands cut off of the charred victims were matched with prison records by the FBI, both being identified as Jonathan Streater and Faustino Arroyo.

Victims
Tanya Moore was a thirty-one-year-old transgender sex worker. She was born in the Germantown section of Philadelphia, Pennsylvania. Tanya had over twenty arrests for prostitution in Pennsylvania going back thirteen years prior to her death. Tiffany Hall, a friend of Tanya and Tina said, "Streater was clean cut and went to church". but that Tina was "boy crazy" and estranged from her family; always getting bailed out of jail for prostitution and other offenses.

Tina Rodriguez was a twenty-seven-year-old transgender sex worker. She was born in Puerto Rico, but grew up in Camden, New Jersey. She had over fifty prostitution arrests in New Jersey, Pennsylvania, and New York prior to her death. Her half-brother, Arnaldo Mojica, told a newspaper in 1986 that Arroyo hadn't been seen at the family's home in Camden for six months leading up to the murders. Mojica said the family knew Arroyo was "gay". Arnaldo also said that Arroyo's mother "went all the time to Philadelphia to get him out of jail, going on to say, "We tried to help him, tell him to stay home, but he would always go away."

Suspects
Around 2001, a witness told police Moore and Rodriguez were killed by himself and an "infamous member of the Warlocks Motorcycle Club" after picking them up for sex and discovering they were transgender. No charges were filed because the statement was made under a proffer agreement.

See also
List of solved missing persons cases
List of unsolved murders

References

External links
Google forum

1980s in Philadelphia
1980s missing person cases
1986 in LGBT history
1986 in Pennsylvania
1986 murders in the United States
Deaths by strangulation in the United States
Duos
Female murder victims
Formerly missing people
History of women in Pennsylvania
July 1986 crimes
July 1986 events in the United States
Missing person cases in Pennsylvania
Sex workers murdered in the United States
Unsolved murders in the United States
Violence against LGBT people in the United States
Violence against trans women
LGBT in Pennsylvania
LGBT culture in Philadelphia